Shui On Land Limited is the flagship property company of the Hong Kong-based Shui On Group. It is engaged in developing large-scale city-core development projects and integrated residential development projects in major cities in China, including Shanghai, Wuhan, Chongqing, Hangzhou, Dalian and Foshan. The company is headquartered in Shanghai and its chairman is Vincent Lo.
 
Shanghai's Xintiandi was developed by Shui On Land as "the first large-scale city-core redevelopment project by Shui On Land."

Shui On Land was listed on the Hong Kong Stock Exchange in 2006.

See also
Real estate in China

References

External links
Shui On Land Limited
Dalian Tiandi 

Companies listed on the Hong Kong Stock Exchange
Real estate companies established in 2004
Real estate companies of China
Companies based in Shanghai
Privately held companies of China
2004 establishments in China